Gunnar Lundqvist (31 October 1915 – 15 March 2001) was a Swedish canoeist who competed in the late 1930s.

He finished second originally in the K-2 1000 m final at the 1936 Summer Olympics in Berlin, but was disqualified for bumping into the German boat of Ewald Tilker and Fritz Bondroit.

References
Sports-reference.com profile

1915 births
2001 deaths
Canoeists at the 1936 Summer Olympics
Olympic canoeists of Sweden
Swedish male canoeists